SD1 or SD-1 may refer to:

South Dakota's 1st congressional district, a United States electoral district
British NVC community SD1, the only shingle community in the British National Vegetation Classification system
MSD SD-1, a floppy disk drive station for Commodore computers
Panasonic HDC-SD1, a digital camcorder
Sigma SD1, a digital SLR camera
Rover SD1, a British car built between 1976 and 1986
Spacek SD-1 Minisport, a Czech amateur-built aircraft design
Northrop SD-1 drone, a battlefield reconnaissance drone of the 1960s
SD1 (gene), a gene that may be part of the agricultural weed syndrome of Oryza sativa and O. rufipogon weeds